Hiking is a long, vigorous walk, usually on trails or footpaths in the countryside. Walking for pleasure developed in Europe during the eighteenth century. Religious pilgrimages have existed much longer but they involve walking long distances for a spiritual purpose associated with specific religions.

"Hiking" is the preferred term in Canada and the United States; the term "walking" is used in these regions for shorter, particularly urban walks. In the United Kingdom and the Republic of Ireland, the word "walking" describes all forms of walking, whether it is a walk in the park or backpacking in the Alps. The word hiking is also often used in the UK, along with rambling, hillwalking, and fell walking (a term mostly used for hillwalking in northern England). The term bushwalking is endemic to Australia, having been adopted by the Sydney Bush Walkers club in 1927. In New Zealand a long, vigorous walk or hike is called tramping. It is a popular activity with numerous hiking organizations worldwide, and studies suggest that all forms of walking have health benefits.

Related terms

In the United States, Canada, the Republic of Ireland, and the United Kingdom, hiking means walking outdoors on a trail, or off trail, for recreational purposes. A day hike refers to a hike that can be completed in a single day. However, in the United Kingdom, the word walking is also used, as well as rambling, while walking in mountainous areas is called hillwalking. In Northern England, Including the Lake District and Yorkshire Dales, fell walking describes hill or mountain walks, as fell is the common word for both features there.

Hiking sometimes involves bushwhacking and is sometimes referred to as such. This specifically refers to difficult walking through dense forest, undergrowth, or bushes where forward progress requires pushing vegetation aside. In extreme cases of bushwhacking, where the vegetation is so dense that human passage is impeded, a machete is used to clear a pathway. The Australian term bushwalking refers to both on and off-trail hiking.  Common terms for hiking used by New Zealanders are tramping (particularly for overnight and longer trips), walking or bushwalking. Trekking is the preferred word used to describe multi-day hiking in the mountainous regions of India, Pakistan, Nepal, North America, South America, Iran, and the highlands of East Africa. Hiking a long-distance trail from end-to-end is also referred to as trekking and as thru-hiking in some places. In North America, multi-day hikes, usually with camping, are referred to as backpacking.

History

The poet Petrarch is frequently mentioned as an early example of someone hiking. Petrarch recounts that on April 26, 1336, with his brother and two servants, he climbed to the top of Mont Ventoux (a feat which he undertook for recreation rather than necessity. The exploit is described in a celebrated letter addressed to his friend and confessor, the monk Dionigi di Borgo San Sepolcro, composed some time after the fact. However, some have suggested that Petrarch's climb was fictional.

Jakob Burckhardt, in The Civilization of the Renaissance in Italy (in German in 1860) declared Petrarch "a truly modern man", because of the significance of nature for his "receptive spirit"; even if he did not yet have the skill to describe nature.<ref>{{Cite web |title=Civilization, Part IV §3, beginning |url=http://www.boisestate.edu/courses/hy309/docs/burckhardt/4-3.html |archive-url=https://web.archive.org/web/20070203015126/http://www.boisestate.edu/courses/hy309/docs/burckhardt/4-3.html |archive-date=February 3, 2007}}</ref> Petrarch's implication that he was the first to climb mountains for pleasure, and Burckhardt's insistence on Petrarch's sensitivity to nature have been often repeated since. There are also numerous references to Petrarch as an "alpinist",  although Mont Ventoux is not a hard climb, and is not usually considered part of the Alps. This implicit claim of Petrarch and Burckhardt, that Petrarch was the first to climb a mountain for pleasure since antiquity, was disproven by Lynn Thorndike in 1943. Mount Ventoux was climbed by Jean Buridan, on his way to the papal court in Avignon before the year 1334, "in order to make some meteorological observations". There were ascents accomplished during the Middle Ages; Lynn Thorndike mentions that "a book on feeling for nature in Germany in the tenth and eleventh centuries, noted various ascents and descriptions of mountains from that period", and that "in the closing years of his life archbishop Anno II, Archbishop of Cologne ((c. 1010 – 1075)) climbed his beloved mountain oftener than usual".

However, the idea of taking a walk in the countryside only really developed during the 18th century in Europe, and arose because of changing attitudes to the landscape and nature associated with the Romantic movement. In earlier times walking generally indicated poverty and was also associated with vagrancy. In previous centuries long walks were undertaken as part of religious pilgrimages and this tradition continues throughout the world.

 German-speaking world 
The Swiss scientist and poet Albrecht von Haller's  poem Die Alpen (1732) is an historically important early sign of an awakening appreciation of the mountains, though it is chiefly designed to contrast the simple and idyllic life of the inhabitants of the Alps with the corrupt and decadent existence of the dwellers in the plains.

Numerous travellers explored Europe on foot in the last third of the 18th century and recorded their experiences. A significant example is Johann Gottfried Seume, who set out on foot from Leipzig to Sicily in 1801, and returned to Leipzig via Paris after nine months.

United Kingdom

Thomas West, a Scottish priest, popularized the idea of walking for pleasure in his guide to the Lake District of 1778. In the introduction he wrote that he aimed to encourage the taste of visiting the lakes by furnishing the traveller with a Guide; and for that purpose, the writer has here collected and laid before him, all the select stations and points of view, noticed by those authors who have last made the tour of the lakes, verified by his own repeated observations.  To this end he included various 'stations' or viewpoints around the lakes, from which tourists would be encouraged to enjoy the views in terms of their aesthetic qualities.  Published in 1778 the book was a major success.
 

Another famous early exponent of walking for pleasure was the English poet William Wordsworth. In 1790 he embarked on an extended tour of France, Switzerland, and Germany, a journey subsequently recorded in his long autobiographical poem The Prelude (1850). His famous poem Tintern Abbey was inspired by a visit to the Wye Valley made during a walking tour of Wales in 1798 with his sister Dorothy Wordsworth. Wordsworth's friend Coleridge was another keen walker and in the autumn of 1799, he and Wordsworth undertook a three-week tour of the Lake District. John Keats, who belonged to the next generation of Romantic poets began, in June 1818, a walking tour of Scotland, Ireland, and the Lake District with his friend Charles Armitage Brown.

More and more people undertook walking tours through the 19th century, of which the most famous is probably Robert Louis Stevenson's journey through the Cévennes in France with a donkey, recorded in his Travels with a Donkey (1879). Stevenson also published in 1876 his famous essay "Walking Tours". The subgenre of travel writing produced many classics in the subsequent 20th century. An early American example of a book that describes an extended walking tour is naturalist John Muir's A Thousand Mile Walk to the Gulf (1916), a posthumously published account of a long botanizing walk, undertaken in 1867.

Due to industrialisation in England, people began to migrate to the cities where living standards were often cramped and unsanitary. They would escape the confines of the city by rambling about in the countryside. However, the land in England, particularly around the urban areas of Manchester and Sheffield, was privately owned and trespass was illegal. Rambling clubs soon sprang up in the north and began politically campaigning for the legal 'right to roam'. One of the first such clubs was 'Sunday Tramps' founded by Leslie White in 1879. The first national grouping, the Federation of Rambling Clubs, was formed in London in 1905 and was heavily patronized by the peerage.

Access to Mountains bills, that would have legislated the public's 'right to roam' across some private land, were periodically presented to Parliament from 1884 to 1932 without success. Finally, in 1932, the Rambler's Right Movement organized a mass trespass on Kinder Scout in Derbyshire. Despite attempts on the part of the police to prevent the trespass from going ahead, it was successfully achieved due to massive publicity. However, the Mountain Access Bill that was passed in 1939 was opposed by many walkers' organizations, including The Ramblers, who felt that it did not sufficiently protect their rights, and it was eventually repealed.

The effort to improve access led after World War II to the National Parks and Access to the Countryside Act 1949, and in 1951 to the creation of the first national park in the UK, the Peak District National Park. The establishment of this and similar national parks helped to improve access for all outdoors enthusiasts. The Countryside and Rights of Way Act 2000 considerably extended the right to roam in England and Wales.

United States

An early example of an interest in hiking in the United States is Abel Crawford and his son Ethan's clearing of a trail to the summit of Mount Washington, New Hampshire in 1819. This 8.5-mile path is the oldest continually used hiking trail in the United States. The influence of British and European Romanticism reached North America through the transcendentalist movement, and both Ralph Waldo Emerson (1803–82) and Henry David Thoreau (1817-62) were important influences on the outdoors movement in North America. Thoreau's writing on nature and on walking include the posthumously published "Walking" (1862)". His earlier essay  "A Walk to Wachusett" (1842) describes a four-day walking tour Thoreau took with a companion from Concord, Massachusetts to the summit of Mount Wachusett, Princeton, Massachusetts and back. In 1876 the Appalachian Mountain Club, America’s earliest recreation organization, was founded to protect the trails and mountains in the northeastern United States.

Despite clubs such as the Appalachian Mountain Club, hiking during the early twentieth century was still primarily in New England, San Francisco, and the Pacific Northwest. Eventually, there were similar clubs formed in the Midwest and following the Appalachian range. As interest grew hiking culture was spread throughout the nation.

The Scottish-born, American naturalist John Muir (1838 –1914), was another important early advocate of the preservation of wilderness in the United States. He petitioned the U.S. Congress for the National Park bill that was passed in 1890, establishing Yosemite and Sequoia National Parks. The Sierra Club, which he founded, is now one of the most important conservation organizations in the United States. The spiritual quality and enthusiasm toward nature expressed in his writings inspired others, including presidents and congressmen, to take action to help preserve large areas of undeveloped countryside. He is today referred to as the "Father of the National Parks". In 1916, the National Park Service was created to protect national parks and monuments.

In 1921, Benton MacKaye, a forester, conceived the idea of what would become America's first National Scenic Trail, the Appalachian Trail (AT). The AT was completed in August 1937, running from Maine to Georgia. The Pacific Crest Trail ("PCT") was first explored in the 1930s by the YMCA hiking groups and was eventually registered as a complete border to border trail from Mexico to Canada.

 Pilgrimages 

Pilgrimage routes are now treated by some walkers as long-distance routes, and the route taken by the British National Trail the North Downs Way closely follows that of the Pilgrims' Way to Canterbury.
 

The ancient pilgrimage, the Camino de Santiago, or Way of St. James, has become more recently the source for a number of long-distance hiking routes. This is a network of pilgrims' ways  leading to the shrine of the apostle Saint James the Great in the cathedral of Santiago de Compostela in Galicia in northwestern Spain. Many follow its routes as a form of spiritual path or retreat for their spiritual growth.

The French Way is the most popular of the routes and runs from Saint-Jean-Pied-de-Port on the French side of the Pyrenees to Roncesvalles on the Spanish side and then another  on to Santiago de Compostela through the major cities of Pamplona, Logroño, Burgos and León. A typical walk on the Camino francés takes at least four weeks, allowing for one or two rest days on the way. Some travel the Camino on bicycle or on horseback. Paths from the cities of Tours, Vézelay, and Le Puy-en-Velay meet at Saint-Jean-Pied-de-Port. The French long-distance path GR 65 (of the Grande Randonnée network), is an important variant route of the old Christian pilgrimage way.

The Abraham Path is a cultural route believed to have been the path of Islamic, Christian, and Jewish patriarch Abraham’s ancient journey across the Ancient Near East. The path was established in 2007 as a pilgrimage route between  Urfa, Turkey, possibly his birthplace, and his final destination of the desert of Negev.

Destinations

 

National parks are often important hiking destinations, such as National Parks of England and Wales; of Canada; of New Zealand, of South Africa, etc.

Frequently, nowadays long-distance hikes (walking tours) are undertaken along long-distance paths, including the National Trails in England and Wales, the Kungsleden (Sweden) and the National Trail System in the United States. The Grande Randonnée (France), Grote Routepaden, or Lange-afstand-wandelpaden (The Netherlands), Grande Rota (Portugal), Gran Recorrido (Spain) is a network of long-distance footpaths in Europe, mostly in France, Belgium, the Netherlands and Spain. There are extensive networks in other European countries of long-distance trails, as well as in Canada, Australia, New Zealand, Nepal, and to a lesser extent other Asiatic countries, like Turkey, Israel, and Jordan. In the Alps of Austria, Slovenia, Switzerland, Germany, France, and Italy walking tours can be made from 'hut-to-hut', using an extensive system of mountain huts.

In the late 20th-century, there has been a proliferation of official and unofficial long-distance routes, which mean that hikers now are more likely to refer to using a long-distance way (Britain), trail (US), The Grande Randonnée (France), etc., than setting out on a walking tour. Early examples of long-distance paths include the Appalachian Trail in the US and the Pennine Way in Britain.

 Asia 

In the Middle East the Jordan Trail is a 650 km (400 miles) long hiking trail in Jordan established in 2015 by the Jordan Trail Association. And Israel has been described as "a trekker's paradise" with over 9,656 km (6,000 miles) of trails.

The Lycian Way is a marked long-distance trail in southwestern Turkey around part of the coast of ancient Lycia. It was conceived by Briton Kate Clow, who lives in Turkey. It takes its name from the ancient civilization, which once ruled the area.

The Great Himalaya Trail is a route across the Himalayas. The original concept of the trail was to establish a single long distance trekking trail from the east end to the west end of Nepal that includes a total of roughly 1,700 kilometres (1,100 mi) of path. The proposed trail will link together a range of the less explored tourism destinations of Nepal's mountain region.

 Latin America 

In Latin America, Peru and Chile are important hiking destinations. The Inca Trail to Machu Picchu in Peru is very popular and a permit is required. The longest hiking trail in Chile is the informal 3,000 km (1,850 mi) Greater Patagonia Trail that was created by a non-governmental initiative.

 Africa 

Equipment

The equipment required for hiking depends on a variety of factors, including local climate. Day hikers often carry water, food, a map, hat, and rain-proof gear. Hikers have traditionally worn sturdy hiking boots for stability over rough terrain. In recent decades this has become less common as some long-distance hikers have switched to trail running shoes. Boots are still commonly used in mountainous terrain. The Mountaineers club recommends a list of "Ten Essentials" equipment for hiking, including a compass, sunglasses, sunscreen, a flashlight, a first aid kit, a fire starter, and a knife. Other groups recommend items such as hat, gloves, insect repellent, and an emergency blanket. A GPS navigation device can also be helpful and route cards may be used as a guide. Trekking poles are also recommended, especially when carrying a heavy backpack. Winter hiking requires a higher level of skill and generally more specialized gear than in other seasons (see winter hiking below).

Proponents of ultralight backpacking argue that long lists of required items for multi-day hikes increases pack weight, and hence fatigue and the chance of injury. Instead, they recommend reducing pack weight, in order to make hiking long distances easier. Even the use of hiking boots on long-distances hikes is controversial among ultralight hikers, because of their weight.

Hiking times can be estimated by Naismith's rule or Tobler's hiking function, while distances can be measured on a map with an opisometer. A pedometer is a device that records the distance walked.

 Hiking with children 
The American Hiking Society advises that parents with young children should encourage them to participate in decision-making about route-finding and pace. Alisha McDarris, writing in Popular Science'', suggests that, whilst hiking with children poses particular challenges, it can be a rewarding experience for them, particularly if a route is chosen with their interests in mind.

Young children are prone to becoming fatigued more rapidly than adults, requiring fluids and energy-rich foods more frequently, and are also more sensitive to variations in weather and terrain. Hiking routes may be chosen with these factors in mind, and appropriate clothing, equipment and sun-protection need to be available.

Environmental impact 

Natural environments are often fragile and may be accidentally damaged, especially when a large number of hikers are involved. For example, years of gathering wood can strip an alpine area of valuable nutrients, and can cause deforestation; and some species, such as martens or bighorn sheep, are very sensitive to the presence of humans, especially around mating season. Generally, protected areas such as parks have regulations in place to protect the environment, so as to minimize such impact. Such regulations include banning wood fires, restricting camping to established campsites, disposing or packing out faecal matter, and imposing a quota on the number of hikers. Many hikers espouse the philosophy of Leave No Trace, following strict practices on dealing with food waste, food packaging, and other impacts on the environment.
Human feces are often a major source of environmental impact from hiking, and can contaminate the watershed and make other hikers ill. 'Catholes' dug 10 to 25 cm (4 to 10 inches) deep, depending on local soil composition and covered after use, at least 60 m (200 feet) away from water sources and trails, are recommended to reduce the risk of bacterial contamination.

Fire is a particular source of danger, and an individual hiker can have a large impact on an ecosystem. For example, in 2005, a Czech backpacker accidentally started a fire that burnt 5% of Torres del Paine National Park in Chile.

Etiquette 

Because hikers may come into conflict with other users of the land or may harm the natural environment, hiking etiquette has developed. 
 When two groups of hikers meet on a steep trail, a custom has developed in some areas whereby the group moving uphill has the right-of-way.
 Various organizations recommend that hikers generally avoid making loud sounds, such as shouting or loud conversation, playing music, or the use of mobile phones. However, in bear country, hikers use intentional noise-making as a safety precaution to avoid startling bears.
 The Leave No Trace movement offers a set of guidelines for low-impact hiking: "Leave nothing but footprints. Take nothing but photos. Kill nothing but time. Keep nothing but memories".
 Hikers are advised not to feed wild animals, because they will become a danger to other hikers if they become habituated to human food, and may have to be killed, or relocated.

Hazards

Hiking can be hazardous because of terrain, inclement weather, becoming lost, or pre-existing medical conditions. The dangerous circumstances hikers can face include specific accidents or physical ailments. It is especially hazardous in high mountains, crossing rivers and glaciers, and when there is snow and ice. At times hiking may involve scrambling, as well as the use of ropes, ice axes and crampons and the skill to properly use them.

Potential hazards involving physical ailments may include dehydration, frostbite, hypothermia, sunburn, sunstroke, or diarrhea, and such injuries as ankle sprains, or broken bones. Hypothermia is a danger for all hikers and especially inexperienced hikers. Weather does not need to be very cold to be dangerous since ordinary rain or mist has a strong cooling effect. In high mountains a further danger is altitude sickness. This typically occurs only above , though some are affected at lower altitudes. Risk factors include a prior episode of altitude sickness, a high degree of activity, and a rapid increase in elevation.

Other threats include attacks by animals (e.g., bears, snakes, and insects or ticks carrying diseases such as Lyme) or contact with noxious plants that can cause rashes (e.g., poison ivy, poison oak, poison sumac, or stinging nettles). Lightning is also a threat, especially on high ground.

Walkers in high mountains, and during winter in many countries, can encounter hazardous snow and ice conditions, and the possibility of avalanches. Year round glaciers are potentially hazardous. Fast flowing water presents another danger and a safe crossing may requires special techniques.

In various countries, borders may be poorly marked. In 2009, Iran imprisoned three Americans for hiking across the Iran-Iraq border. It is illegal to cross into the US on the Pacific Crest Trail from Canada. Going south to north it is more straightforward and a crossing can be made, if advanced arrangements are made with Canada Border Services. Within the Schengen Area, which includes most of the E.U., and associated nations like Switzerland and Norway, there are no impediments to crossing by path, and borders are not always obvious.

Winter hiking

Hiking in winter offers additional opportunities, challenges and hazards. Crampons may be needed in icy conditions, and an ice ax is recommended on steep, snow covered paths. Snowshoes and hiking poles, or cross country skis are useful aid for those hiking in deep snow.
An example of a close relationship between skiing and hiking is found in Norway, where The Norwegian Trekking Association maintains over 400 huts stretching across thousands of kilometres of trails which hikers can use in the summer and skiers in the winter. For longer routes in snowy conditions, hikers may resort to ski touring, using specialised skis and boots for uphill travel. In winter, factors such as shortened daylight, changeable weather conditions and avalanche risk can raise the hazard level of hiking.

See also
American Hiking Society
Historic roads and trails
Outdoor literature

Types
Backpacking (hiking). And, in winter, Ski touring
Dog hiking – hiking where a dog carries a pack
Fastpacking – fast hiking with light gear 
Glacier hiking – hiking on a glacier that has affinities to mountaineering
Llama hiking  – hiking where llamas accompany people 
Nordic Walking – fitness walking with trekking poles
Swimhiking –  a sport that combines hiking and swimming
Ultralight backpacking – carrying the least amount of gear necessary
Waterfalling – hiking that explores waterfalls

Related activities
Cross-country skiing – hiking snow with the aid of skis 
Fell running – the sport of running over rough mountainous ground, often off-trail
Geocaching – an outdoor treasure-hunting game
Orienteering – a sport that involves navigation with a map and compass
Peak bagging – ticking-off a list of mountain peaks climbed 
Pilgrimage – a journey of moral or spiritual significance
River trekking – a combination of trekking and climbing and sometimes swimming along a river
Rogaining – a sport of long-distance cross-country navigation
Snow shoeing – walking across deep snow on snow shoes 
Trail blazing – using signages to mark a hiking route (known as way-marking in Europe)
Trail running – running on trails
Thru-hiking – hiking an established long-distance hiking trail continuously in one direction.

References

Bibliography
  See summary of contents

External links

 
Tourist activities
Scoutcraft
Walking
Adventure travel